Sous lieutenant Basile Félicien Sauné was a French World War I flying ace credited with five aerial victories.

Biography
See also Aerial victory standards of World War I

Basile Félicien Sauné was born in La Bastide-du-Salat, France on 1 January 1887.

In 1917, he served his mandatory military service as an infantryman and was released to the reserves. On 2 August 1914, he was recalled for World War I. After serving over a year's trench duty, he transferred to aviation. He received his Military Pilot's Brevet on 21 August 1916 when he graduated primary training. After advanced training, he was shipped off to l'Armee Orient. He scored no victories with Escadrille MF.85, but once transferred to Escadrille  531 to fly a Nieuport 11 "Bebe", he shot down five enemy airplanes between 30 April and 13 June 1918 to become an ace.

Basile Félicien Sauné was killed in action in a dogfight with several enemy airplanes a week after his last victory, on 20 June 1918.

For his valor, he had been granted Serbian and Greek awards, in addition to his native France's Croix de Guerre.

Sources of information

Reference

 Franks, Norman; Bailey, Frank (1993). Over the Front: The Complete Record of the Fighter Aces and Units of the United States and French Air Services, 1914–1918. London, UK: Grub Street Publishing. .

External links

  Biography, list of victories, color profiles of his planes

1887 births
1918 deaths
French World War I flying aces
Recipients of the Croix de Guerre 1914–1918 (France)
French military personnel killed in World War I